Puter (also spelled Putèr) is a variety of Romansh spoken in the Engadin valley in Graubünden, which is in the southeastern part of Switzerland. It is spoken in the central northwestern end of the valley between S-chanf and St. Moritz, as well as in the region of the Bernina Pass. Romansh was named by 5,497 people within the upper Engadine valley (30%) as a habitually spoken language in the census of 2000, which probably corresponds roughly to the total number of speakers. The term is probably originally a nickname derived from put 'porridge', meaning 'porridge-eaters'.

Classification 

Puter and Vallader are sometimes referred to as one specific variety known as Ladin, as they have retained this word to mean Romansh. However, the term Ladin is primarily associated with the closely related language in Italy's Dolomite mountains also known as Ladin. Puter and Vallader are distinguished from the other Romansh dialects among other things by the retention of the rounded front vowels // and // (written ü and ö), which have been derounded to // and // in the other dialects. Compare Putèr  to Sursilvan  ‘wall’ and Putèr  to Sursilvan  'cheese'.

Each village between S-chanf and St. Moritz has a slightly different accent, although the written form remains the same.

Sample 
The fable The Fox and the Crow by Jean de La Fontaine in Putèr Romansh, as well as a translation into English, the similar-looking but noticeably different-sounding dialect Vallader, and Rumantsch Grischun.

References

Bibliography

External links 

Romansh-English dictionary, with different Romansh dialects including Puter

Romansh dialects